Prior to the establishment of the two Korean states in 1948, the Provisional Government of the Republic of Korea was established in Shanghai in September 1919 as the continuation of several governments proclaimed in the aftermath of March 1st Movement earlier that year coordinated Korean people's resistance against Japan during the Japanese occupation of Korea. The legitimacy of the Provisional Government has been recognised and succeeded by South Korea in the latter's original Constitution of 1948 and the current Constitution of 1988. Nine people have served twenty-four terms as Heads of State (with varying titles) of the Provisional Government between September 1919 and August 1948.

List of heads of state of the Provisional Government

Heads of governments proclaimed after the March 1st Movement (1919)

Following the March 1st Movement with the Declaration of Independence, several groups within Korea and Korean diaspora proclaimed the establishment of republican governments, claiming to be the representation of the Korean people. Three of these proclaimed governments remained active in the months thereafter and amalgamated to form the unified Provisional Government of the Republic of Korea.

Four other governments were proclaimed in the aftermaths of the March 1st Movement but these did not have significant activity following the proclamation.
The Provisional Government of the Republic of Chosun (조선민국임시정부) proclaimed in Seoul on 19 April 1919: President (정도령) Son Byong-hi
The Government of the Republic of New Korea (신한민국정부) proclaimed in Northwestern Korea including Pyongyang on 17 April 1919: Consul (집정관) Lee Dong-hwi
The Government of the Korean Republic (고려공화국정부) proclaimed in Manchuria in early 1919
The Provisional Government in Gando (간도임시정부) proclaimed in Jilin in early 1919

There was a further plan to proclaim The Korean Civil Government (대한민간정부) on 1 April 1919 with Son Byong-hi as the President (대통령) in the anticipation of the success of the March 1st Movement; the planned proclamation was not distributed.

Consul-President of the Great Korean Republic (Seoul Government)

The Great Korean Republic (대조선공화국) was proclaimed in Seoul on April 23, 1919, by 24 representatives gathered from 13 provinces of Korea. It is commonly known as the Seoul Government (한성정부). Syngman Rhee was elected by the assembled representatives as the Consul-President (집정관총재). Rhee sent letters to foreign heads of state including those of the United States, Japan and the United Kingdom notifying these countries of the proclamation of the Republic and his election as the President. It was agreed at the time of the amalgamation with the Governments of Shanghai and Vladivostok that the new unified Provisional Government is the successor government of the legitimacy of the Seoul Government.

Prime Ministers of the Provisional Government of the Republic of Korea (Shanghai Government)

The Provisional Government of the Republic of Korea (대한민국 임시정부) was established in Shanghai on 11 April 1919 as a result of the first meeting of the Provisional Assembly from the previous night (10 April 1919). Syngman Rhee was elected as the Prime Minister (국무총리). The Government was amalgamated with the Governments proclaimed in Seoul and Vladivostok on 11 September 1919 to form the unified Provisional Government.

President of the National Parliament of Korea (Vladivostok Government)

The National Parliament of Korea (대한국민의회) was proclaimed in Vladivostok on 17 March 1919 by the Korean diaspora living in Primorsky Krai, as the re-organisation of the Korean Central General Assembly (한족중앙총회). Son Byong-hi, the leader of 33 representatives who signed the Korean Declaration of Independence on 1 March 1919, was elected as the President. The government was amalgamated with the governments proclaimed in Seoul and Shanghai on 11 September 1919.

Heads of state of the Provisional Government of the Republic of Korea (1919-1948)

Three of the Governments proclaimed in 1919 continued to be active in the months after the March 1st Movement; the Governments proclaimed in Seoul, Shanghai and Vladivostok. After a period of negotiations, members of these three governments agreed to form the unified Provisional Government in Shanghai, with succession of the legitimacy of the Seoul Government and bringing the members of the Vladivostok legislature into the Shanghai legislature. The unified Provisional Government of the Republic of Korea was established on 11 September 1919 with a new constitution.

The forms of the government from September 1919 were:
Prime minister (국무총리제): 1919
Presidency (대통령제): 1919-1925
Presidency of the Governance (국무령제): 1925-1927
State Council (국무위원제): 1927-1940
Chairpersonship of the State Affairs Commission (국무위원회 주석제): 1940-1948

In total, nine people served twenty-four terms as the Heads of States of the Provisional Government between September 1919 and August 1948, when the last Chairman of the State Council Syngman Rhee became the first President of South Korea.

South Korea
Korea politics-related lists
Korean politicians
Political history of Korea